Calotomus viridescens, commonly known as the viridescent- or dotted parrotfish, is a species of parrotfish native to the waters of the Maldives and Red Sea, from the Gulf of Aqaba to south to the Chagos Archipelago. It was described by the German naturalist Eduard Rüppell in 1835.

References

External links
 

 

Fish of the Indian Ocean
Taxa named by Eduard Rüppell
Fish described in 1835
viridescens